Dunafalva is a  village and municipality in Bács-Kiskun county, in the Southern Great Plain region of southern Hungary.

History

The village was established in 1954 by Dunaszekcsőnek lying on the left side of the outer parts of the Danube.

Geography

Demographics
  Magyars 
  Croats

References

Populated places in Bács-Kiskun County